Nuclear blackmail is a form of nuclear strategy in which an aggressor uses the threat of use of nuclear weapons to force an adversary to perform some action or make some concessions. It is a type of extortion that is related to brinkmanship.

Effectiveness
Nuclear blackmail is usually ineffective against a rational opponent that has or is an ally of a power with assured destruction capability. If the opponent has nuclear weapons, nuclear blackmail becomes a threat of conflict escalation. In that situation if the opponent refuses to respond, one's choices are withdrawal of the threat of nuclear attack, incurring a major loss of prestige (both in domestic and international politics), or carrying out the threat resulting in mutual nuclear destruction. During the Cold War, the explicit threat of nuclear warfare to force an opponent to perform or not to perform an action was rare since most nations of any importance were allies of the Soviet Union or the United States.

History
In 1950, US president Harry S. Truman publicly stated that the use of nuclear weapons was under "active consideration" against Chinese targets during the Korean War. 

In 1953, US president Dwight D. Eisenhower threatened the use of nuclear weapons to end the Korean War if the Chinese refused to negotiate.

In order to support the continued existence of the Republic of China government, the United States issued several nuclear threats against the People's Republic of China in the 1950s to force the evacuation of outlying islands and the cessation of attacks against Quemoy and Matsu.

Declassified documents from the UK National Archives indicate that the United Kingdom considered threatening China with nuclear retaliation in 1961 in the event of a military reclamation of Hong Kong by China.

In 1981, the US Department of Energy said there had been 75 cases of people attempting nuclear blackmail against the US but only several were serious attempts.

In 1991, Israel threatened Iraq with a "nuclear counter-response" if there was an attack using chemical weapons during the Gulf War.

In 2002, the George W. Bush administration declared that it was prepared to strike with nuclear missiles against Iraq if biological or chemical weapons were used against American troops or their allies during the Iraq War.

In 2005, Chinese major general Zhu Chenghu said that China might retaliate with nuclear weapons if the United States attacked Chinese forces in a conflict over Taiwan.

On January 2, 2018, US president Donald Trump threatened North Korea that the US has much more nuclear firepower than North Korea in response to a press release stating that a "nuclear button is on Kim Jong-un's desk at all times."

On February 24, 2022, in the TV address where Vladimir Putin announced Russia's invasion of Ukraine, Putin warned that any countries interfering would face consequences they had never encountered in their history. This was widely interpreted as being a threat of nuclear attack. Several days later, Putin put Russia's nuclear forces on a higher state of alert.

See also 
 Brinkmanship
 Deterrence theory
 Essentials of Post–Cold War Deterrence
 Mutual assured destruction
 Nuclear terrorism
 Samson Option

References

Nuclear strategy
Extortion